The Custer Creek train wreck (sometimes called the Saugus train wreck) is the worst rail disaster in Montana history. It occurred on June 19, 1938 when a bridge, its foundations washed away by a flash flood, collapsed beneath Milwaukee Road's Olympian as it crossed Custer Creek, near Saugus, Montana, south-west of Terry, killing at least 47 people.

Bridge AA-438

It consisted of two  plate girder spans and five reinforced concrete trestle slab spans carrying the single track across the creek resting on concrete piers. An inspection of the bridge earlier that year had concluded the bridge was in good condition with sufficient rip-rap in place to prevent scouring.

Custer Creek

But on the night in question a cloudburst deposited an estimated  of rain on the area drained by the creek.

Olympian

The westbound Olympian that night was hauled by Class S-2 4-8-4 No.220 and comprised eleven cars. It was traveling from Chicago to Tacoma and carrying 155 passengers when it neared Custer Creek at a speed of 50 mph.

Wreck

As the Olympian crossed at 12:35 a.m. the bridge collapsed; the engine and seven passenger cars were thrown into the swollen creek On the west bank the locomotive and five cars were "piled in a shambles of crumpled steel", killing the engineer and fireman. The wreck happened so quickly that when the body of the engineer was recovered he was still sitting in his seat with his hand on the throttle. "Two other cars ended up deep in the roaring creek". Rescue efforts were mounted by the train crew and uninjured passengers; smashing windows on the partly submerged cars to provide escape routes. Newspapers reported the paradox that modern air-conditioned rolling stock requiring sealed windows, and the use of shatterproof glass was partially responsible for some deaths

Investigation

The investigation determined that the volume and velocity of water flowing beneath the bridge that night was "much in excess of any that had been experienced before or might be anticipated at this place". The bridge structure was still intact when the train reached it but two of the central piers had been undermined. The weight of the locomotive caused the piers to subside and the bridge to collapse.

References

External links
Custer Creek, MT Washout Of Trestle Causes Wreck, June 1938
ICC Investigation No.2278
British Pathe newsreel

Railway accidents in 1938
Railway accidents and incidents in Montana
1938 in Montana
Bridge disasters in the United States
Bridge disasters caused by scour damage
Prairie County, Montana
Accidents and incidents involving Chicago, Milwaukee, St. Paul and Pacific Railroad
June 1938 events